Maceda is a surname. Notable people with the surname include:

Antonio Maceda (born 1957), Spanish footballer and manager
Ernesto Maceda (1935–2016), Filipino politician
Jim Maceda (born 1949), American journalist
José Maceda (1917–2004), Filipino composer and ethnomusicologist